Henrique Chaves (born 21 March 1997) is a Portuguese racing driver.

Career

Karting
Born in Torres Vedras, Chaves entered karting in 2006, when he took the title in the Portuguese Championship and Portuguese Cup in the Cadets Class. Chaves raced in karting until the 2015, collecting further titles in the Rotax Mini Class, Kf3, X30 and X30 Shifter classes of the Portuguese Championship, double title in the X30 class of the Spanish Championship, while his most notable karting achievement was the second place in the KZ2 category of the Spanish championship as well as the second place in the Iame X30 Finals in 2015.

Formula Renault
Chaves made his single seaters debut on the 2-litre Formula Renault machinery, competing in the Formula Renault 2.0 Northern European Cup full-time with AVF. He had twelve point-scoring finishes, while his highest-finishing position was the final race of the season at Hockenheim, where he finished fifth. He had a thirteenth place in the championship. He also has competed in the three round of the 2015 Eurocup Formula Renault 2.0.

Chaves stayed for another season with AVF for double full-time campaign in both Eurocup and NEC. He had seven point-scoring finishes in Eurocup and finished the season eleventh. While in the NEC he failed to improve his championship position, having just one finish in the top-five in the first race at Spa.

In 2017 Chaves concentrated on Eurocup, continuing with AVF. Henrique managed to score his first podium in the Formula Renault category, when he finished second in the first race at Silverstone. But he wasn't able to keep the momentum and after a couple of difficult races in Monaco and Pau he went on to score eight more point-scoring finishes, which led him to the twelfth place in the drivers' standings.

World Series Formula V8 3.5
Chaves expanded his collaboration with AVF into the World Series Formula V8 3.5, joining them for the finale at Bahrain International Circuit. He won his debut race, starting from the front row of the grid. He was the seventh driver to achieve a debut win in this series since it started in 1998. In the second race of the weekend he again started from the front row, however this time he got collected by Alfonso Celis Jr. who dived from far beck on his inside, costing Chaves another highly probable podium result.

European Le Mans Series
Chaves decided to switch to sports car racing, joining the LMP2 class with AVF in the 2018 European Le Mans Series. On his first season in this championship, Chaves showed good race craft and maturity for someone his age, although the results don't demonstrate his true performance on track. 
Chaves started the season by setting the fastest overall lap during the European Le Mans Series Prologue. He went on to put his LMP2 car in the podium positions for the first half of the race in Monza before the team withdraw with electrical issues. He continued to show his pace in Silverstone with a comeback from tenth on the grid to second place over a triple stint effort and in Portimão he was able to pass the car over in third place, just before his teammate run into LMP3 cars and forced the team to withdraw the car with irreparable damage.

International GT Open
2019 saw Chaves make the switch into GT racing. He switched to Teo Martín Motorsport, another Spanish team that has been racing GT3 machinery for several years. Chaves teamed up with the Croatian Martin Kodrić in the debutant McLaren 720S GT3 for the season. Chaves started the season well with a second place in Paul Ricard on his first ever race with GT3 cars. The season continued and he managed to score five more podiums, two fastest laps and a win at the season finale where the car number 59 still was in contention for the title. They end up finishing third place overall tied with the second, while registering the best championship result of any McLaren 720s GT3 worldwide in the year 2019.

The partnership with Teo Martin Motorsport carried on while Miguel Ramos joined Chaves in an attempt for the overall championship win in 2020.
Chaves left no doubt about his capabilities in 2020 and clinched the title after a dramatic season finale where their most direct competitor has thrown the McLaren number 59 off track, leaving the car stranded on the gravel on the last lap of the last race of the championship. He won two times, stood on the podium six times and was seven times the fastest on track. Once again his car was the best representative of all the McLaren GT3 cars racing around the world by winning the International GT Open Title.

Racing record

Career summary

† As Chaves was a guest driver, he was ineligible to score points.
* Season still in progress.

Complete Formula Renault Eurocup results
(key) (Races in bold indicate pole position) (Races in italics indicate fastest lap)

† As Chaves was a guest driver, he was ineligible to score points

Complete European Le Mans Series results

‡ Half points awarded as less than 75% of race distance was completed.

Complete GT World Challenge Europe Sprint Cup results
(key) (Races in bold indicate pole position) (Races in italics indicate fastest lap)

Complete FIA World Endurance Championship results
(key) (Races in bold indicate pole position; races in italics indicate fastest lap)

24 Hours of Le Mans results

References

External links

1997 births
Living people
People from Torres Vedras
Portuguese racing drivers
Formula Renault 2.0 NEC drivers
Formula Renault Eurocup drivers
World Series Formula V8 3.5 drivers
24 Hours of Le Mans drivers
Sportspeople from Lisbon District
European Le Mans Series drivers
FIA Motorsport Games drivers
International GT Open drivers
Asian Le Mans Series drivers
FIA World Endurance Championship drivers
AV Formula drivers
Teo Martín Motorsport drivers
Lamborghini Squadra Corse drivers